Middlefield Hamlet Historic District is a national historic district located at Middlefield in Otsego County, New York.  It encompasses 24 contributing principal buildings and eight contributing dependencies.  All but one of the buildings are residences.  It also includes a Greek Revival style frame store building.

It was listed on the National Register of Historic Places in 1985.

References

Historic districts on the National Register of Historic Places in New York (state)
Historic districts in Otsego County, New York
National Register of Historic Places in Otsego County, New York